Réal Andrews (born Réal Johnson; January 31, 1963) is a Canadian actor. He is known for playing Chance Walker in the first season of the syndicated action drama series Soldier of Fortune, Inc., and for playing Marcus Taggert on the ABC daytime soap opera General Hospital since 1996.

Early life and education
Born Réal Johnson, Andrews was raised in Vancouver, British Columbia by a single mother. Andrews did not have a relationship with his biological father, a musician who abandoned Andrews and his mother when he was only a few years old. Andrews only met his birth father one another time while in college. When Andrews was 21 years old, his mother Troy married Cyril Nathan Andrews, who adopted Reál as his own. Andrews was raised as a Catholic and attended an all boys private school. Growing up, Andrews wasn't interested in acting at all and described himself as a jock. Andrews was first exposed to acting when his aunt invited him to a seminar at her acting school. In 1981, the 18 year Andrews relocated to Toronto, Canada for college where found work in the entertainment industry.

Career
Andrews started his career in 1981 as a stuntman, becoming one of the first Black stunt men in Canada. While he had a long list of credits, Andrews had been working as a struggling actor for years by the time he booked General Hospital in late 1996. Marcus Taggert which originally was an "under-five" role which would help launch Andrews career. From 1997 to 1999, Andrews would also star in the Dan Gordon created series, Soldier of Fortune, Inc.. He would leave the role of Taggert for a few months in 1997 only to return by year's end. In 2003, Andrews chose not to renew his contract with General Hospital and Taggert was written in May 2003. Andrews quickly joined the cast of CBS Daytime's As the World Turns as Walker Daniels in 2003. Only a year later, Andrews was let go from the series. In 2010, Andrews joined the cast of the web series, The Bay as Dr. Keith Campbell. In 2015, Andrews joined the cast of Days of Our Lives in a recurring role. In 2020, Andrews made an unannounced return to General Hospital as Taggert on January 17, 2020.

Personal life
On November 4, 2000, Andrews married Michele Viscasso. They have three children together.

Filmography

Film

Television

References

External links

1963 births
Living people

Black Canadian male actors
Canadian male television actors
20th-century Canadian male actors
21st-century Canadian male actors
Canadian male soap opera actors